The Convent Van Maerlant is a former convent which consists of a church and the Chapel of the Resurrection on the / in Brussels, Belgium. It is named after Jacob van Maerlant, a famous medieval Flemish poet.

The original chapel was built in 1435 in the authority of a Papal Bull, and was renovated in the 1780s. The convent of the Sisters of Perpetual Adoration itself was converted from a Ducal town house in the early 1850s. In 1905, a compulsory purchase order for land for Brussels Central Station was made on the /, and this included the convent. As a result, a virtually identical chapel was built, which survived for another 45 years, only finally being demolished in 1955. Falling vocations meant the convent was closed in the early 1980s, and after standing derelict for nearly 20 years, it was acquired to become the central library of the European Commission. This is the only pre-WW2 building to be left standing in the area after the entry of European institutions.

History

First church
The Sisters of Perpetual Adoration, who became the Sisters of the Eucharist in 1969, were a chief Eucharistic Order founded by Anna de Meeûs, the eldest daughter of the Belgian Finance Minister and founding Chairman of the Société Générale de Belgique, Count Frederic de Meeûs. The original foundation was set up in 1844 in workshops belonging to the Church of Our Blessed Lady of the Sablon. The sisterhood rapidly outgrew its location. In 1848 the foundress' childhood friend the Baroness d'Hoogvorst (née Countess of Mercy-Argenteau) bought the building, originally the Town House of the Counts of Salazar, on the / from the Visiting Sisters. The Sisters took up residence in 1850, and with the original chapel soon too small, they rebuilt the neighbouring wing of the house as a modern red neo-Gothic church. The chapel was built in 1435 on the corner of the / where Brussels' first synagogue had stood until the Jews were evicted in a pogrom in 1370 – the Papal Bull establishing the Eucharistic vocation as an expiation of the Host desecration.

The entire neighbourhood was acquired by the State in 1907 as part of a project to connect the North and South railway termini. The convent lay on the site of the planned  (now the /) which was designed by Henri Maquet to link the Royal Palace of Brussels with the centre. The convent buildings were bought by the city and served as a gym for the local primary school. Later, the church became a depot Brussels' electric and road works department and the chapel housed a local garage owner. In 1955, they were all demolished in order to build the Galerie Ravenstein.

New building
However, when the Dames left, they moved to the Maalbeek valley, and missing their old convent, copied the church and chapel (known as the Salazar from the Spanish noble family who built the adjoining mansion which would in due course become the main convent building) in an identical style, though lacking some features due to monetary constraints. However, after time they were unable to manage and left in 1974. The building deteriorated while developers argued, with one wishing to build seven nine-story office blocks on its site.

Such development was blocked as the site was reserved for the Council of the European Union who had to put the area over to housing. Public authorities pushed for its restoration and the developers eventually agreed. In 1996, it was fully renovated with a central atrium over the cloister, but the original features all still present. It is now occupied by the European Commission. The side chapel was also restored with sponsorship and was re-inaugurated the Chapel of the Resurrection or the Chapel for Europe, on 25 September 2001.

Architecture
The church is a 19th-century red brick neo-Gothic construction, though the rebuilt version of the early 1900s lacks the tower, side isles, stone decorations, rose window and pinnacles of the original.

The chapel, known today as Chapel of the Resurrection, is a duplicate of the 15th and 18th Century original and was completely renovated in the 1990s, losing almost all its original internal features. It is neoclassical, with Doric columns, pediment and friezes. The stained glass windows were painted by Thomas Reinhold of Vienna. They were produced by the factory of the Schlierbach convent in Upper Austria and financed by nine Austrian regions to cover five biblical themes.

Area and usage
The church serves as the central library of the European Commission, the Directorate-General for Interpretation, the Directorate-General for Education and Culture and the Brussels Office for Infrastructure and Logistics (the Commissions historical archives service). The chapel is used as a local chapel and for dialogue between Christian groups in Europe.

It is located in areas known as the European Quarter and the Leopold Quarter. The neighbouring building to the south, built in the late 1980s and also housing Commission offices, is of unusually high quality, out of a desire to help it fit in with its neighbouring gothic church. Its height was also restricted to that of the convent.

Further to the south is Leopold Park and the Espace Léopold complex of the European Parliament and the buildings of the Committee of the Regions and Economic and Social Committee. To the east is a car park and the Place Jean Rey/Jean Reyplein and to the north is the Justus Lipsius building of the Council of the European Union.

See also

 Berlaymont building
 Charlemagne building
 Breydel building
 Madou Plaza Tower
 Brussels and the European Union
 Institutional seats of the European Union
 European Library

References

Roman Catholic churches in Belgium
Roman Catholic churches in Brussels
City of Brussels
Religious buildings and structures completed in 1435
European quarter of Brussels
Convents in Belgium
European Commission
Buildings and structures of the European Union